First Cabinet of Edward Szczepanik (Pierwszy rząd Edwarda Szczepanika) was the second-to-last of cabinets of the Polish Government in Exile, preceding Cabinet of Kazimierz Sabbat (who became President) and second Szczepanik Cabinet.

 Prime Minister: Edward Szczepanik
 Minister of Education: Czesław Czapliński
 Minister of the Treasury: Stanisław Borczyk
 Minister of the Emigrees Affairs: Zbigniew Scholtz
 Minister of Home Affairs: Ryszard Kaczorowski
 Minister of the Military Affairs: Lt. Col. Jerzy Morawicz
 Minister of Foreign Affairs: Zygmunt Szkopiak
 Minister of Justice: Stanisław Wiszniewski
 Minister of Information: Andrzej Czyżewski
 Minister of the Ordered Matters: Tadeusz Drzewiecki
 Minister of the Relations with USSR-occupied nations: Aleksander Snastin
 Secretary of the Council of Ministers: Jerzy Zaleski

Szczepanik, Edward